Christophe Fourcault de Pavant (born 23 February 1961 in Saint-Pardoux-la-Rivière in the Dordogne region), also known as Kito de Pavant, is a French sailor.

Vendee Globe attempts
He has not been lucky in the Vendee Globe having started three times and never finishing.

In the 2008-2009 Vendée Globe the day after the start (28 hours), his mast was broken in a storm in the Bay of Biscay and he abandoned the race.

In the 2012-2013 Vendée Globe on the same boat he hit a trawler on the third day (43 hours) of the race and retired unaided to the Cascais.

Thing got even worse in 2016-2017 Vendée Globe when he was forced to abandon his boat Bastide Otio following a collision with a sperm whale.

Key results

Gallery

References

External links
 
 
 

1961 births
Living people
Sportspeople from Dordogne
French male sailors (sport)
Farr 30 class sailors
Figaro class sailors
IMOCA 60 class sailors
French Vendee Globe sailors
2008 Vendee Globe sailors
2012 Vendee Globe sailors
2016 Vendee Globe sailors